Bilad Al-Rafidain Sport Club is an Iraqi football team based in Baqubah, Diyala, that plays in Iraq Division Two.

Managerial history

  Abbas Ahmed

See also 
 2020–21 Iraq FA Cup
 2021–22 Iraq FA Cup

References

External links
 Bilad Al-Rafidain SC on Goalzz.com
 Iraq Clubs- Foundation Dates

2019 establishments in Iraq
Association football clubs established in 2019
Football clubs in Diyala